New York State Route 323 (NY 323) was a state highway in Erie County, New York, in the United States. NY 323 began at an intersection with NY 249 and County Route 9 (CR 9) in Brant and headed north to a junction with NY 5 in Evans Center. In between, it passed over the New York State Thruway (Interstate 90 or I-90) and intersected U.S. Route 20 (US 20).

The route was assigned as part of the 1930 renumbering of state highways in New York. It went unchanged until 1980 when ownership and maintenance of the route was transferred from the state of New York to Erie County as part of a highway maintenance swap between the two levels of government. The designation was officially removed on August 14, 1980. The former routing of NY 323 is now the northern half of CR 9.

Route description

NY 323 began at an intersection with NY 249 and CR 9 north of the Cattaraugus Indian Reservation in Brant. The route headed northward as Brant–Angola Road through a rural area dominated by open fields and forests. It proceeded to the Brant–Evans town line, where it met Cain Road (CR 491) a short distance south of the New York State Thruway (I-90). The highway progressed onward, passing over the Thruway on its way to a junction with Dunfee Road, a connector leading to US 20. NY 323 met US 20 itself a short distance to the northwest.

The route headed northwest from US 20, intersecting with Pontiac Road (CR 490) as it curved back to the north and entered the village of Angola. Within Angola, NY 323 followed Main Street northward past several blocks of homes and business. At Orchard Avenue, the street turned to the northwest, roughly paralleling Big Sister Creek as both exited the village limits. Past this point, the amount of development along the route dropped slightly as it continued northward toward the hamlet of Evans Center. NY 323 crossed over Big Sister Creek south of the community before ending at a junction with NY 5 in the center of the hamlet.

History

NY 323 was assigned as part of the 1930 renumbering of state highways in New York and served as a connector between NY 249 in Brant and US 20 (now NY 5) in Evans. On April 1, 1980, ownership and maintenance of NY 323 was transferred from the state of New York to Erie County as part of a highway maintenance swap between the two levels of government. The NY 323 designation was officially removed on August 14, 1980. The former routing of NY 323 became an extension of CR 9, which had ended at the junction of NY 249 and NY 323 prior to the swap.

Major intersections

See also

List of county routes in Erie County, New York (1–32)

References

External links

323
Transportation in Erie County, New York